Archolaemus santosi is a species of glass knifefish endemic to Brazil where it is found in the Rio Mucajaí and Rio Uraricoera in the north-eastern portions of the Amazon basin.

Etymology
The knifefish is named in honor of Geraldo Mendes dos Santos of the Instituto Nacional de Pesquisas da Amazônia, who collected the type specimen.

References

Sternopygidae
Fish of South America
Fish of Brazil
Taxa named by Richard Peter Vari
Taxa named by Carlos David Canabarro Machado de Santana
Taxa named by Wolmar B. Wosiacki
Fish described in 2012